Ceyhun Altay (born August 15, 1986) is a Turkish professional basketball player who last played as a swingman for Büyükçekmece Basketbol of the Turkish Basketball League.

External links
Ceyhun Altay FIBA Profile
Ceyhun Altay TBLStat.net Profile
Ceyhun Altay Eurobasket Profile
Ceyhun Altay TBL Profile

1986 births
Living people
Darüşşafaka Basketbol players
Basketball players from Istanbul
Turkish men's basketball players
Karşıyaka basketball players
Small forwards
Shooting guards